The 21st Annual Nickelodeon Kids' Choice Awards was held on March 29, 2008, at the Pauley Pavilion, Los Angeles, California. The show was the first live-action/animated Kids Choice Awards show. The event was hosted by Jack Black. Voting began March 3 on Nick.com and Nicktropolis. A "Bring on the Nominees" special hosted by Lil' JJ aired also. The Naked Brothers Band and Miley Cyrus were musical performances for the show. A sweepstakes was announced to promote the show. The number of votes cast broke the record previously set in 2007. 86,708,020 kids cast 88,254,272 votes (since kids were allowed to vote multiple times) between March 3–29 in 18 categories, to honor and vote for their favorites. Votes were cast via Nick.com, Nicktropolis, TurboNick, and for the first time via Nick's new mobile website (wap.nick.com). The award show attracted 7.7 million viewers.

The 2008 Kids' Choice Awards is notable for being the only time that SpongeBob SquarePants did not win the Kids' Choice Award for Favorite Cartoon since the show was first nominated in 2003, with Avatar: The Last Airbender winning instead.

Presenters and Performers, and Stunts for KCA 2008

Presenters (in order of appearance)

Performers (in order of appearance)
The Naked Brothers Band performed "I Don't Want to Go to School"
Miley Cyrus performed "G.N.O (Girl's Night Out)"

Slimed Celebrities
Harrison Ford – While presenting Favorite Voice From an Animated Movie with Shia LaBeouf, Ford replaced an orb containing the winner with a blimp, similar to the classic scene in Raiders of the Lost Ark. Also like that scene, a "booby-trap" bucket of slime was dumped onto his head. Ford joked about it and LaBeouf gave him his trademark fedora.
Brendan Fraser – While presenting Favorite TV Show with Rihanna, who was carrying an umbrella, Fraser asked why she had one. The singer slyly replied that "this is for you", and a stream of slime rose from the podium and hit Fraser's forehead.
Orlando Bloom – Bloom was the mystery celebrity at the end of the show who got slimed with 27 gallons of the green goo alongside Jack Black.
Jack Black – The host was slimed at the end of the show with the 27 gallons of slime collected from the slime stunts with Orlando Bloom.

Slime Stunts (in order of appearance)

1/3 – Akon performed the Slime-o-Lition Derby driving the Jack Black Bobblehead.
2/3 – Usher performed using a high pressure slime cannon shooter blasting the costume sumo wrestler five feet. (Note: The level was tilted so the sumo wrestler can go to 5 ft.)
3/3 – Heidi Klum performed the human dartboard using a butt spike belt.

Nicktoon appearance
 Otis and Pip form Back at the Barnyard.

Winners and nominees
Winners are listed first, in bold. Other nominees are in alphabetical order.

Movies

Television

Music

Sports

Miscellaneous

Wannabe Award
 Cameron Diaz

The Rocktopus
The Rocktopus is an eight legged octopus of rock n' roll who haunts Jack Black in his dreams. Later during the awards show, they settle their differences in time for the Rocktopus to activate the slimer machine.

iCarly: Live From Hollywood
The iCarly cast was live outside the Pauley Pavilion in Hollywood, where the 2008 Kids' Choice Awards were held. The cast aired from 9/8c - 11/10c. Carly, Sam, Freddie, and Spencer were at the Kids' Choice Awards because Spencer was hired to make a Kids' Choice Awards Blimp out of Wieners. Although Spencer was working on his sculpture, he happened to peek around the show, like the Gift bags for the Celebrities, going into Jack Black's Dressing Room, and stealing some mini wienies from the Snack table. In the end, his sculpture was destroyed when the Snack lady attacked him. People actually believed that it was a fan who destroyed the sculpture as security tackled the Snack Lady.

Musical Guests
Countdown to Kids' Choice:
Lil' Mama - Shawty Get Loose

The Show:
 The Naked Brothers Band, "I Don't Want To Go to School"
 Miley Cyrus, "G.N.O. (Girl's Night Out)"

References

External links
 
 Nickelodeon Kids' Choice Awards Press Kit (Nominees)
 Nickelodeon Kids' Choice Awards Main Website

Nickelodeon Kids' Choice Awards
Kids' Choice Awards
Kids' Choice
Kids' Choice Awards
2008 in Los Angeles
Television shows directed by Beth McCarthy-Miller